Ekaterina Durova (25 July 1959 – 13 December 2019) was a Russian actress. She was honored as a Merited Artist of the Russian Federation in 2005.

Biography
Durova was born on 25 July 1959 in Moscow. She was born into a family of actors, as her father was famed Soviet theatre actor Lev Durov, and her mother, Irina Kirichenko, was also an actress. In 1976, she enrolled in the Russian Academy of Theatre Arts and obtained her degree in 1984. After her education, she was an actress who starred in theatrical performances at the Taganka Theatre in Moscow. She then worked at the Moscow Drama Theater on Malaya Bronnaya, where she would stay until her death.

In addition to her theatrical performances, Durova appeared in numerous films. She made her debut on screen playing a student in the teen melodrama School Waltz in 1977. She would then receive a starring role in Faratyev's Fantasies (1982).

Durova married two actors, with her first husband being Sergei Nasibov, and her second being Vladimir Ershov.

Filmography
School Waltz (1978)
Faratyev's Fantasies (1979)
Dulsinea del Toboso (1980)
Phenomenon (1983)
The Green Van (1983)
The Admirer (1999)
Yuri's Day (2008)
Crush (2009)
Vdoviy parokhod (2010)
23.59 (2016)
Bloody Mistress (2018)

References

1959 births
2019 deaths
Russian stage actresses
Actresses from Moscow
Russian film actresses
20th-century Russian actresses
21st-century Russian actresses
Russian Academy of Theatre Arts alumni